The dawn chorus occurs when birds sing at the start of a new day. In temperate countries this is most noticeable in spring when the birds are either defending a breeding territory, trying to attract a mate or calling in the flock. In a given location it is common for different species to do their dawn singing at different times. In a study of the Ecuadorian forest, it was determined that birds perching higher in the trees and birds with larger eyes tend to pipe up first. These correlations may be caused by the fact that both would also correlate with the amount of light perceived by the bird.

Moller used a play-back technique to investigate the effects of singing by the black wheatear (Oenanthe leucura) on the behaviour of both conspecifics and heterospecifics.  It was found that singing increased in both groups in response to the wheatear. Moller suggested the dawn (and dusk) chorus of bird song may be augmented by social facilitation due to the singing of conspecifics as well as heterospecifics.

In some territories where bird life is extensive and birds are vocal, the sound of a dawn chorus may make it difficult for humans to sleep in the early morning.

International Dawn Chorus Day 

An annual International Dawn Chorus Day is held on the first Sunday in May when the public are encouraged to rise early to listen to bird song at organised events. The first ever was held at Moseley Bog in Birmingham, England, in 1984, organized by the Urban Wildlife Trust (now The Wildlife Trust for Birmingham and the Black Country).

New Zealand
Early explorers and European settlers noted that the New Zealand forest had a loud dawn chorus. This is no longer the case owing to extensive loss of forests, the introduction of bird predators and competing species such as wasps. The bellbird and the tui are two of the birds that would have formed part of the dawn chorus since they have a vocal and melodious call.

United Kingdom

In the UK the dawn chorus may begin as early as 3am in early summer. The most often heard species of birds are, in order of their beginning to sing:

 Blackbird
 Robin
 Eurasian wren
 Tawny owl
 Chaffinch
 Common pheasant
 Warblers, including blackcap, chiffchaff, garden warbler and willow warbler
 Song thrush
 Greenfinch
 Dunnock
 Goldfinch

United States
The dawn chorus may also be heard in the United States.

See also
Bird song
Dawn chorus (electromagnetic)
Natural sounds

References

External links
International Dawn Chorus Day
The language of birds: The dawn chorus

Bird sounds
Ethology